Michel Pébereau (born 23 January 1942 in Paris) is a French businessman. He is the current chairman of Banque Nationale de Paris (BNP) and its former CEO.  He graduated from the École Polytechnique in 1965 and the École nationale d'administration in 1967.

Biography
Pébereau began his business career in 1967 at the Inspection générale des finances.  Three years later he joined the French Treasury and held a variety of high-ranking positions.  He is currently a member of the board of directors for various organizations internationally.

References

1942 births
Living people
Lycée Louis-le-Grand alumni
École Polytechnique alumni
École nationale d'administration alumni
Inspection générale des finances (France)
Businesspeople from Paris
French bankers
BNP Paribas people
Grand Officiers of the Légion d'honneur